Tuska Chal (also Romanized as Tūskā Chāl and Towskā Chāl) is a village in Kuhsarat Rural District, in the Central District of Minudasht County, Golestan Province, Iran. At the 2006 census, its population was 526, in 137 families.

References 

Populated places in Minudasht County